Celebration is the fourth studio album of jazz guitarist Norman Brown released in 1999 on Warner Bros. Records. The album reached No. 2 on the Billboard Contemporary Jazz Albums chart and No. 4 on the Billboard Top Jazz Albums chart.

Overview
Brown covered The Stylistics' "You Make Me Feel Brand New" on the album.

A song from the LP called "Rain" also reached No. 15 on the Billboard Adult R&B Songs chart.

Track listing

Credits
Arranged by David Woods (tracks: 7, 8, 12), Norman Brown (tracks: 5, 6, 9 to 11), Oji Pierce (tracks: 4), Paul Brown (tracks: 1 to 3, 8)
Co-producer – Herman Jackson (tracks: 5, 6, 9 to 11), Michael Vail Blum (tracks: 5, 6, 9 to 11)
Executive Producer – Matt Pierson
Mastered By Don C. Tyler
Producer – Norman Brown (tracks: 5, 6, 9 to 11), Oji Pierce (tracks: 4), Paul Brown (tracks: 1 to 3, 7, 8, 12)
Written by Brian Alexander Morgan (tracks: 7, 12), Brian Culbertson (tracks: 1), Jaco Pastorius (tracks: 7, 12), Kimberly Ross (tracks: 8), Linda Creed (tracks: 4), Lynne Fiddmont-Lindsey (tracks: 8), Norman Brown (tracks: 1, 2, 3, 5, 6, 8 to 11), Paul Brown (tracks: 1, 2, 8), Thomas Randolph Bell (tracks: 4), Todd Sucherman (tracks: 1)

References

1999 albums
Norman Brown (guitarist) albums
Warner Records albums